Najjar Kola may refer to:
 Najjar Kola, Amol
 Najjar Kola, Babol
 Najjar Kola, Chalus
 Najjar Kola-ye Jadid, Simorgh County
 Najjar Kola-ye Qadim, Simorgh County